California's 2nd congressional district is a U.S. congressional district in California. Jared Huffman, a Democrat, has represented the district since January 2013. Currently, it encompasses the North Coast region and adjacent areas of the state. It stretches from the Golden Gate Bridge to the Oregon border, and includes all of the portions of Highway 101 within California that are north of San Francisco, excepting a stretch in Sonoma County.
The district consists of Marin, Mendocino, Humboldt, Del Norte, and Trinity Counties, plus portions of Sonoma County. Cities in the district include San Rafael, Petaluma, Novato, Windsor, Healdsburg, Ukiah, Fort Bragg, Fortuna, Eureka, Arcata, McKinleyville, Crescent City, and northwestern Santa Rosa.

History 

From 2003 until the redistricting by the California Citizens Redistricting Commission that took effect in 2013, the 2nd district encompassed much of the far northern part of the state, from the Central Valley north of Sacramento to the Oregon border. It was the largest district by area in California. It consisted of Colusa, Glenn, Shasta, Siskiyou, Sutter, Tehama, Trinity, and Yuba counties, plus portions of Butte and Yolo counties.

The district had a dramatically different political history than its current incarnation. While the current 2nd is one of the most Democratic districts in California, the old 2nd had been a Republican stronghold for almost three decades. Much of this territory is now the 1st district, while most of the current 2nd had been split between the 1st and 6th districts from 2003 to 2013.

Election results from statewide races

Composition 

As of the 2020 redistricting, California's 2nd district is located on the North Coast. It encompasses Del Norte, Humboldt, Marin, Mendocino, and Trinity Counties, as well as most of Sonoma County.

Sonoma County is split between this district and the 4th district. They are partitioned by the Petaluma River, Highway 116, Redwood Highway, Robber Rd, Petersen Rd, Llano Rd, S Wright Rd, W College Ave, Jennings Ave, Administration Dr, Bicentennial Way, Cleveland Ave, Old Redwood Highway, Cross Creek Rd, Sonoma Highway, and Sonoma Creek. The 2nd district takes in the Monroe District of Santa Rosa, and the cities of Petaluma and Healdsburg.

Cities with 10,000 or more people
 San Rafael - 61,271
 Novato - 53,225
 Eureka - 26,710
 Arcata - 18,857
 Ukiah - 16,607
 Mill Valley - 14,231
 Larkspur - 13,064
 Fortuna - 12,516
 Corte Madera - 10,222

2,500-10,000 people
 Sausalito - 7,269
 Fort Bragg - 6,983
 Crescent City - 6,673
 Willits - 4,988
 Rio Dell - 3,349

List of members representing the district

Election results

1864

1867

1868

1871

1872

1875

1876

1879

1880

1882

1884

1886

1888

1890

1892

1894

1896

1898

1900 (Special)

1900 (General)

1902

1904

1906

1908

1910

1912

1914

1916

1918

1920

1922

1924

1926 (Special)

1926

1928

1930

1932

1934

1936

1938

1940

1942

1943 (Special)

1944

1946

1948

1950

1952

1954

1956

1958

1960

1962

1964

1966

1968

1970

1972

1974

1976

1978

1980

1982

1984

1986

1988

1990

1992

1994

1996

1998

2000

2002

2004

2006

2008

2010

2012

2014

2016

2018

2020

2022

See also
 List of United States congressional districts

References

External links
 GovTrack.us: California's 2nd congressional district
 RAND California Election Returns: District Definitions (out of date)
 California Voter Foundation map - CD02 (out of date)

02
Government of Marin County, California
Government of Mendocino County, California
Government of Humboldt County, California
Government of Del Norte County, California
Government of Sonoma County, California
Government of Trinity County, California
Crescent City, California
Eureka, California
Lakeport, California
San Rafael, California
Ukiah, California
Weaverville, California
Constituencies established in 1865
1865 establishments in California